DCOM may stand for:

Doctor of Commerce
Distributed Component Object Model, a Microsoft technology for software distributed across several networked computers to communicate with each other
DC One Million, a mini-series and storyline in the DC Comics fictional universe
DeBusk College of Osteopathic Medicine, a school of osteopathic medicine at Lincoln Memorial University
Digital Commerce Association - The Digital Commerce Association of the Philippines [DCOM]
Disney Channel Original Movie, a movie created for and played on Disney Channel